Lakhang is a family name that belongs to a Singpho or Jinghpaw tribe living sparsely in India and Kachin State, Myanmar.

Ethnic groups in Myanmar
Ethnic groups in India
Surnames